"Nights" is a song written by Byron Hill and Tony Hiller, and recorded by American country music artist Ed Bruce. It was released in April 1986 as the first single from the album Night Things.  The song reached number 4 on the Billboard Hot Country Singles & Tracks chart.

Chart history

References

Songs about nights
1986 songs
Ed Bruce songs
1986 singles
Songs written by Byron Hill
Songs written by Tony Hiller
RCA Records singles